Nir Barzilai is the founding director of the Institute for Aging Research, the Nathan Shock Center of Excellence in the Basic Biology of Aging and the Paul F. Glenn Center for the Biology of Human Aging Research at Albert Einstein College of Medicine (Einstein). He also directs the Longevity Genes Project, a genetics study of over 600 families of centenarians and their children. The participants are all Ashkenazi Jews, a group selected for their genetic homogeneity, which makes it easier to identify significant genetic variations. Barzilai found that many of the centenarians had very high levels of HDL. Barzilai also co-founded of CohBar, Inc., a biotechnology company developing mitochondria based therapeutics to treat diseases associated with aging.

Barzilai discovered several “longevity genes” in humans that were validated by others. These include variants in genes involved in cholesterol metabolism (CETP and APOC3 ), metabolism (ADIPOQ and TSHR) and growth (IGF1R). These genes appear to protect centenarians against major age-related diseases, such as cardiovascular disease, cancer, type 2 diabetes and dementia.

Treatments for age-related diseases are being developed based on Barzilai’s work and are currently in clinical trials with Anacetrapib. The diabetes research is led by CohBar Inc., a biotech company that Barzilai helped co-found.

In addition to his “longevity gene” research, Barzilai studies key mechanisms involved in the biology of aging, including how nutrients and genetics influence lifespan. He has also proposed metformin as a tool to target aging and has run the Metformin in Longevity Study (completed May 2018) He is also investigating how mental decline and personality affect longevity.

Barzilai was born in Haifa, Israel. During his national service in the Israel Defense Forces, he served as a medical instructor. In 1976, he served as a medical officer in Operation Entebbe. He was the Israeli army's chief medic from 1977 to 1985. He studied medicine at the Technion – Israel Institute of Technology, obtaining his MD in 1985. He interned at Rambam Medical Center in Haifa, Hadassah Medical Center in Jerusalem, and the Royal Free Hospital in London. He first came to the U.S. in 1987 as a resident at Yale University. He joined Einstein in 1993 as an instructor of medicine (endocrinology).

References 

Living people
Israeli geneticists
Israeli medical researchers
Technion – Israel Institute of Technology alumni
Albert Einstein College of Medicine faculty
1955 births